Events in the year 2011 in Latvia.

Incumbents
President - Valdis Zatlers (until 1 July), Andris Bērziņš (starting 1 July)
Prime Minister - Valdis Dombrovskis

Events
2011 Latvian presidential election

Arts and entertainment
In music: Latvia in the Eurovision Song Contest 2011.

Sports
Football (soccer) competitions: Baltic League, Latvian Higher League, Latvian Football Cup. See also: List of Latvian football transfers winter 2010-2011.

Deaths

References

 
Latvia
Years of the 21st century in Latvia